= Midway in Life =

1953 film

- Directed by: Mehdi Besharatian
- Written by: Asadollah Nazari
- Production company: Honar Film
- Release date: 31 October 1953
- Running time: 100 minutes
- Country: Iran
- Language: Persian

Midway in Life (Persian: Nimeh rahe zendegi) is a 1953 Iranian film directed by Mehdi Besharatian.

== Bibliography ==
- Mohammad Ali Issari. Cinema in Iran, 1900-1979. Scarecrow Press, 1989.
